Waterfall  is a song recorded by Taiwanese singer-songwriter, Eve Ai. It is written by Eve and produced by Chen Chien-Chi. The song was released as a non-album single, on 17 May 2017 by Sony Music Taiwan. It is a Mandopop song with electric arrangement, which comprises a melody based on electric guitar, violin, viola and cello.

Background 
It took around one year for Eve to write the song. According to her, she came up with the song during a hiking trip around a lake in Taiwan.

Personnel 
Personnel list adapted from the description of Waterfall music video.
Song Production

 Eve Ai – songwriting, lead vocals, vocal harmonies writing, backup vocal
 Chen Chien Chi – producer
 Huang Shao Yong – arranger
 Han Li Kang – guitar
 Liu Han – string writing, cello
 Cai Yao Yu – violin
 Lu Szu Chien – violin 
 Gan Wei Peng – viola
 Wen Yi Zhe – engineering
 Chen Yi Lin – engineering
 Wang Jun Jie – mix engineering
 Cai Zhi Zhong – executive producer

Music Video

 Xu Li Yun – actress
 Hsieh Shan Shan – actor
 Kang Xiang – actor
 Yeh Chen Ting – actress
 Birdy Nio – director, conceptualization
 Wang Pin Xiang – conceptualization
 Sun Wei Qiang – producer
 Li Wei Chen – line producer
 Wang Hong Cheng – production assistant

References 

Eve Ai songs
2017 songs